Melhania is a genus of small shrubs or herbaceous plants. Traditionally included in the family Sterculiaceae, it is included in the expanded Malvaceae in the APG and most subsequent systematics. The genus is named for Mount Melhan in Yemen.

The following species are recognised by Plants of the World Online (POWO):

Melhania acuminata Mast.
Melhania albiflora (Hiern) Exell & Mendonça
Melhania ambovombeensis Arènes
Melhania andrahomanensis Arènes
Melhania angustifolia K.Schum.
Melhania annua Thulin
Melhania apiculata Baker f.
Melhania beguinotii Cufod.
Melhania brachycarpa Domin
Melhania burchellii DC.
Melhania cannabina Wight ex Mast.
Melhania carrissoi Exell & Mendonça
Melhania corchoriflora Baill.
Melhania coriacea Chiov.
Melhania damarana Harv.
Melhania decaryana Arènes
Melhania dehnhardtii K.Schum.
Melhania denhamii R.Br.
Melhania didyma Eckl. & Zeyh.
Melhania engleriana K.Schum.
Melhania fiherenanensis Arènes
Melhania forbesii Planch. ex Mast.
Melhania fruticosa Arènes
Melhania futteyporensis Munro ex Mast.
Melhania hamiltoniana Wall.
Melhania hiranensis Thulin
Melhania humbertii Arènes
Melhania incana B.Heyne ex Wight & Arn.
Melhania integra I.Verd.
Melhania itampoloensis (Hochr.) Arènes
Melhania jaberi Abedin
Melhania javanica Adelb.
Melhania kelleri Schinz
Melhania latibracteolata Dorr
Melhania magnifolia Blatt. & Hallb.
Melhania mananarensis Arènes
Melhania menafe Arènes
Melhania minutissima Hochr.
Melhania muricata Balf.f.
Melhania oblongifolia F.Muell.
Melhania orbiculari-dentata Arènes
Melhania ovata (Cav.) Spreng.
Melhania parviflora Chiov.
Melhania perrieri Hochr.
Melhania phillipsiae Baker f.
Melhania poissonii Arènes
Melhania polygama I.Verd.
Melhania polyneura K.Schum.
Melhania praemorsa Dorr
Melhania prostrata Burch.
Melhania quercifolia Thulin
Melhania randii Baker f.
Melhania rehmannii Szyszył.
Melhania rotundata Hochst. ex Mast.
Melhania sidoides (Wight & Arn.) Noltie
Melhania somalensis Baker f.
Melhania spathulata Arènes
Melhania steudneri Schweinf.
Melhania stipulosa J.R.I.Wood
Melhania substricta Dorr
Melhania suluensis Gerstner
Melhania transvaalensis Szyszył.
Melhania tulearensis Arènes
Melhania velutina Forssk.
Melhania virescens K.Schum.
Melhania vohipalensis Arènes
Melhania volleseniana Dorr
Melhania zavattarii Cufod.

Melhania decanthera (Cav.) DC and M. laurifolia Bojer are now in Dombeya (as D. decanthera and D. laurifolia). 2021 study subsumed Trochetiopsis, endemic to Saint Helena, and Paramelhania, native to Madagascar into Melhania.

References

 
Malvaceae genera
Taxonomy articles created by Polbot